The following list of Carnegie libraries in Connecticut provides detailed information on United States Carnegie libraries in Connecticut, where 11 libraries were built from 8 grants (totaling $191,900) awarded by the Carnegie Corporation of New York from 1901 to 1914.

Key

Carnegie libraries

Notes

References

Note: The above references, while all authoritative, are not entirely mutually consistent. Some details of this list may have been drawn from one of the references (usually Jones) without support from the others.  Reader discretion is advised.

External links
New England Carnegies

Connecticut
 
Libraries
Libraries